Henry "Mule" Townsend (born Henry Jesse James Townsend; October 27, 1909 – September 24, 2006) was an American blues singer, guitarist and pianist.

Career
Townsend was born Henry Jesse James Townsend in Shelby, Mississippi to Allen and Omelia Townsend. His father was a blues musician who played guitar and accordion. When Henry was young, his family moved near Cairo, Illinois. Henry left home at the age of nine because of his abusive father and hoboed his way to St. Louis, Missouri. He learned guitar while in his early teens from a locally renowned blues guitarist known as Dudlow Joe. With aspirations to earn a living with his guitar, Townsend also worked as an auto mechanic, a shoe shiner, a hotel manager, and a salesman.

By the late 1920s he had begun touring and recording with the pianist Walter Davis and had acquired the nickname Mule, because he was sturdy in both physique and character. In St. Louis, he worked with some of the early blues pioneers, including J. D. Short. During this time period, he also learned to play the piano.

Townsend was one of the only artists known to have recorded in nine consecutive decades. He first recorded in 1929, for Columbia Records in Chicago,  and remained active up to 2006. He performed on 35 recordings in 1935 alone. By the mid-1990s, Townsend and his one-time collaborator Yank Rachell were the only active blues artists whose careers had started in the 1920s. He recorded on several different labels, including Columbia, Bluesville Records, and Folkways Records.

By the mid-1950s, the popularity of the St. Louis style of blues had begun to wane in the United States, so Townsend worked in Europe where he felt his music was more appreciated. His European concerts drew large audiences, and he also appeared at many festivals. Townsend said wryly that he has been "rediscovered three or four times".

Articulate and self-aware, with an excellent memory, Townsend gave many invaluable interviews to blues enthusiasts and scholars. Paul Oliver recorded him in 1960 and quoted him extensively in his 1967 work Conversations with the Blues. That book was inducted into the Blues Hall of Fame in 1991, in the Classics of Blues Literature category. Thirty years later, Bill Greensmith edited thirty hours of taped interviews with Henry to produce a full autobiography, A Blues Life, giving a vivid history of the blues scene in St Louis and East St Louis in its prime.

In 1979, Bob West recorded Townsend in St. Louis.  That recording was released on CD in 2002 on Arcola Records as The Real St. Louis Blues.

Townsend died on September 24, 2006, at the age of 96, at St. Mary's Ozaukee Hospital, in Mequon, Wisconsin, just hours after having been the first person to be presented with a "key" in Grafton's Paramount Plaza Walk of Fame.
     While [Henry Townsend] did not scorn his old recordings, he had no taste for spending his later years simply recreating them.
     Blues, for him, was a living medium, and he continued to express himself in it, most remarkably in his songwriting.
          —Tony Russell, The Guardian

Selected discography
 1966: Blues Rediscoveries (Folkways Records)
 1970: The Country Blues: Vol. 2 (Folkways Records)
 1973: Henry T. Music Man (Adelphi Records AD1016)
 1980: Mule (Nighthawk)
 1984: The Blues in St. Louis, Vol. 3: Henry Townsend (Folkways Records)
 1998: The 88 Blues (Blueberry Hill Records)
 2001: The Real St. Louis Blues (Arcola Records, recorded 1979)
 2003: Classic Blues from Smithsonian Folkways (Smithsonian Folkways)
 2004: My Story (APO Records)
 2007: Last of the Great Mississippi Delta Bluesmen: Live in Dallas (Blue Shoe Project)
 2008: Classic Piano Blues from Smithsonian Folkways (Smithsonian Folkways)
 2015: Original St. Louis Blues Live (Wolf Records, recorded 1980)

Filmography
 1970, reissued 1986: Blues Like Showers of Rain
 1999: Hellhounds on My Trail: The Afterlife of Robert Johnson (directed by Robert Mugge)
 2007: 10 Days Out: Blues From the Backroads
 unknown date: The Devil's Music: A History of the Blues

Awards and honors
In 1980, Townsend's album Mule was nominated in the first national Blues Music Awards in the Traditional Blues Album category.

In 1982, his album St. Louis Blues (with his wife Vernell Townsend) was nominated for a Blues Music Award in the Traditional Blues Album category.

Townsend was a recipient of a 1985 National Heritage Fellowship awarded by the National Endowment for the Arts, which is the United States government's highest honor in the folk and traditional arts.

In 1995 he was inducted into the St. Louis Walk of Fame.

On February 10, 2008, Townsend was posthumously awarded a Grammy, his first, at the 50th Annual Grammy Awards. The award, in the category Best Traditional Blues Album, was given for his performances on Last of the Great Mississippi Delta Bluesmen: Live In Dallas, released by the Blue Shoe Project. Townsend's son, Alonzo Townsend, accepted the award on his behalf.

On December 4, 2009, a marker commemorating Townsend was added to the Mississippi Blues Trail.

See also
 List of blues musicians
 Chicago Blues Festival
 Kentuckiana Blues Society

References

External links
 
 
 Blue Shoe Times outlining Henry's life
 Illustrated Henry Townsend discography
 Townsend Discography on Folkways
 Henry James Townsend (1909): The last surviving Paramount recording artist, by Alex van der Tuuk.
, 35 minutes.

1909 births
2006 deaths
African-American guitarists
American blues guitarists
American male guitarists
American blues pianists
American male pianists
American blues singers
Blues musicians from Mississippi
Grammy Award winners
National Heritage Fellowship winners
People from Shelby, Mississippi
People from Cairo, Illinois
Musicians from St. Louis
Mississippi Blues Trail
St. Louis blues musicians
Columbia Records artists
Paramount Records artists
Bluebird Records artists
20th-century American guitarists
20th-century American pianists
Singers from Missouri
Guitarists from Mississippi
Guitarists from Missouri
African-American pianists
Southland Records artists
20th-century African-American male singers